The 2015–16 Hofstra Pride women's basketball team represents Hofstra University during the 2015–16 NCAA Division I women's basketball season. The Pride, led by tenth year head coach Krista Kilburn-Steveskey, play their home games at Hofstra Arena and were members of the Colonial Athletic Association. They finished the season 25–9, 13–5 in CAA play to finish in a tie for second place. They lost in the quarterfinals of the CAA women's tournament to Northeastern. They were invited to the Women's National Invitation Tournament they defeated Harvard, Villanova and Virginia in the first, second and third rounds before losing to Florida Gulf Coast in the quarterfinals.

Previous season
They finished last season 20–13, 11–7 in CAA play to finish in a tie for third place. They advanced to the championship game of the 2015 CAA women's basketball tournament where they lost to James Madison. They were invited to the Women's National Invitation Tournament where they lost in the first round to Penn.

Roster

Schedule

|-
!colspan=9 style="background:#16007C; color:#FFAD00;"| Non-conference regular season

|-
!colspan=9 style="background:#16007C; color:#FFAD00;"| CAA regular season

|-
!colspan=9 style="background:#16007C; color:#FFAD00;"| CAA Women's Tournament

|-
!colspan=9 style="background:#16007C; color:#FFAD00;"| WNIT

See also
2015–16 Hofstra Pride men's basketball team

References

Hofstra Pride women's basketball seasons
Hofstra
2016 Women's National Invitation Tournament participants